Group 6 consisted of four of the 32 teams entered into the European zone: Bulgaria, Cyprus, Northern Ireland, and Portugal. These four teams competed on a home-and-away basis for one of the 9.5 spots in the final tournament allocated to the European zone, with the group's winner claiming the place in the finals.

Standings

Matches

Notes

External links 
Group 6 Detailed Results at RSSSF

6
1972–73 in Bulgarian football
1973–74 in Bulgarian football
1972–73 in Cypriot football
1973–74 in Cypriot football
1972–73 in Northern Ireland association football
1973–74 in Northern Ireland association football
1972–73 in Portuguese football
1973–74 in Portuguese football